This is a list of Assamese language films produced by the film industry of Assam, India based in Guwahati and publicly released in the year 2019. Premiere shows and film festival screenings are not considered as releases for this list.

Scheduled releases
Background color  indicates the current running in theaters

January - June

July - December

References  

2019
Assamese
Assamese